The Marx House is a private house at 2630 Biddle Avenue in Wyandotte, Michigan. It was listed on the National Register of Historic Places and designated a Michigan State Historic Site in 1976. It is now used by the Wyandotte Historical Museum.

History
This house was built in approximately 1862 for Warren Isham. In the next 60 years, the house went through six owners, including Charles W. Thomas, Wyandotte's first druggist, and Dr. Theophilus Langlois, a prominent physician who served as Wyandotte's mayor for two terms and contributed to other civic projects in the city. In 1921, the house was purchased by John Marx, the city attorney and scion of a local brewery owner. In 1974, John Marx's children Leo Marx and Mary T. Polley gave the house to the city of Wyandotte. The house was opened to the public in 1996.

Description
The Marx House is a two-story Italianate townhouse built of red brick and sitting on a stone foundation. The facade features a double entrance door and tall windows topped with semicircular brick-and-stone hoods. A truncated hipped roof, with ornamental ironwork at the perimeter of the uppermost flat area, caps the structure. A two-story frame wing with a single-story addition is connected at the rear of the building.

References

External links
Wyandotte Museums

Houses on the National Register of Historic Places in Michigan
Italianate architecture in Michigan
Houses completed in 1862
Houses in Wayne County, Michigan
1862 establishments in Michigan
National Register of Historic Places in Wayne County, Michigan